Black Butte (formerly Wintoon Butte, Cone Mountain, Sugar Loaf and Muir's Peak) is a cluster of overlapping dacite lava domes in a butte,
a satellite cone of Mount Shasta.  It is located directly adjacent to the northbound lanes of Interstate 5 at milepost 742 between the cities of Mount Shasta and Weed, California. The I-5 freeway crosses a  pass, Black Butte Summit, at the western base of the lava domes. The lava domes were extruded at the foot of the cone of Shastina following the period of its major eruptions about 9,000–10,000 years ago.

A United States Forest Service fire lookout tower was built on the summit in the early 1930s, but destroyed during the Columbus Day Storm of 1962. A new lookout was built in 1963 and operated until 1973. The building was moved by helicopter to a new location in 1975 and only the concrete foundation remains today. A  trail leads to the summit from a trailhead accessible by gravel roads off the Everitt Memorial Highway.
The summit boasts an outstanding view of the southwest side of Shasta and Shastina, and on clear days Mount McLoughlin is easily visible  to the north in Oregon.

See also
 Volcanic Legacy Scenic Byway

References

Further reading

External links
 

Volcanoes of Siskiyou County, California
Cascade Volcanoes
Holocene lava domes
Mount Shasta
Subduction volcanoes
Buttes of California
Fire lookout towers in California
Shasta-Trinity National Forest
Landforms of Siskiyou County, California